John 'Numbers' Goldberg is an American gamer known for winning the 2015 Nintendo World Championship and being the runner-up at the 2017 Nintendo World Championship.

Goldberg qualified for the 2015 Nintendo World Championships by receiving a score of 4.7 million on the NWC regional challenge at Best Buy in Long Island, NY. He returned for the 2017 NWC as one of the 13-and-older qualifiers after completing the GBA Bowser Castle 1 track in Mario Kart 7 with a time of 1:16.120.

Goldberg received television coverage on Disney XD.

References

Year of birth missing (living people)
Living people
Super Smash Bros. for Wii U players